The following is a list of Algerian musicians:

A 
 Abderrahmane Abdelli, musician
 Ahmad Baba Rachid
 Amar Ezzahi, singer of Chaabi music

B 
 Bellemou Messaoud
 Boualem Boukacem, singer, poet, musician

C 
 Cheb Mami, prince of Raï
 Cheikha Rimitti, mother of Raï from Sidi Bel-Abbes

D 
 Dahmane El Harrachi, a singer composer and songwriter of Chaabi music
 DJ Snake

E 
 El Hachemi Guerouabi, musician and reformer of the Chaabi classical style
 El Hadj M'Hamed El Anka, Master of Chaabi classical music

F 
 Fadhéla Dziria, singer of Hawzi classical style music

H 
 Houari Manar, Raï singer
 Hamdi Benani

I 
 Idir

K 
 Kamel Messaoudi, singer of Chaabi music
 Khaled, king of Raï. Singer, songwriter now living in France

L 
 Lounès Matoub,  Berber Kabyle singer, poet, thinker and mandole player who was a prominent advocate of the Berber cause

M 
 Mohamed Boumerdassi, musician and master of the Bedouin style
 Mohamed Tahar Fergani, musician and master of the Malouf classical style

R 
 Rachid Taha, based in France. His music mixes rock, punk and techno with traditional Arabic instruments
 Raïna Raï, Raï band from Sidi Bel-Abbes

S 
 Speed Caravan, Franco-Algerian Folktronica band
 Souad Massi singer, songwriter and guitarist now living in France

W 
 Warda Al-Jazairia, singer of classical Arab oriental music

Z 
 Zaho, an Algerian R&B singer based in Canada

See also
Algerian music

Musicians
Algeria
Algerian musicians